The following is a list of Indiana State Sycamores men's basketball head coaches. There have been 26 head coaches of the Sycamores in their 123-season history.

Indiana State's current head coach is Josh Schertz. He was hired as the Sycamores' head coach in March 2021, replacing Greg Lansing, who was fired after the 2020–21 season.

References

Indiana

Indiana State Sycamores basketball, men's coaches